Sadabad-e Fenderesk (also Romanized as Sa‘dābād-e Fenderesk) is a village in Fenderesk-e Shomali Rural District, Fenderesk District, Ramian County, Golestan Province, Iran. At the 2006 census, its population was 2,268, in 555 families.

References 

Populated places in Ramian County